Garrett Sinnott (born 9 May 1987 in Oulart, County Wexford, Ireland) is an Irish sportsperson.  He plays hurling with his local club Oulart–The Ballagh and has been a member of the Wexford senior inter-county team since 2011.

References

1987 births
Living people
Oulart-the-Ballagh hurlers
Wexford inter-county hurlers